Thierry Toutain (born 14 February 1962 in Fourmies) is a retired French race walker. With a time of 3:40:57.9, achieved in 1996, Toutain held the world record over 50,000 metres track walking until 12 March 2011, when Yohann Diniz broke it with a time of 3:35:27.

Achievements

External links

1962 births
Living people
French male racewalkers
Olympic athletes of France
Athletes (track and field) at the 1988 Summer Olympics
Athletes (track and field) at the 1992 Summer Olympics
Athletes (track and field) at the 1996 Summer Olympics
European Athletics Championships medalists